Tõhelgi village is a small low-density village in the eastern part of Harju County, Raasiku Parish. It is the smallest village in Raasiku Parish - 47 people live in the village as of 01.01.2020.

Historical background 
Tõhelgi village is one of the oldest populated areas in northern Estonia, as evidenced by settlements, stone-cist graves and numerous sacrificial stones. In the 1840s, the Tõhelgi Manor was established in place of the former cluster village. The Soviet authorities brought significant changes to Tõhelgi village - the land of Tõhelgi was collectivised, and in 1947 a collective farm "Tõhelgi Liit" was formed, which was eventually merged with the Aruküla collective farm through various mergers. In 1967, a variety testing centre was established in the north-eastern part of the village to test various fruit and berry crops. It operated until the early 1990s.

References

Villages in Harju County